Valdas Trakys (born 20 March 1979) is a Lithuanian football coach and a former player. He is the manager of Neptūnas.

Playing career
Trakys started his professional career in 1995 with FK Panerys Vilnius in his native Lithuania. He played for FC Harelbeke and FBK Kaunas before moving to Russia to play for Torpedo Moscow. After a year with FC Khimki, Trakys left Russia to play for FH Hafnarfjörður in Iceland. Trakys then moved to Germany, playing for Greuther Fürth.

Since 2004, Trakys has played in Russia, Lithuania, Azerbaijan and Greece. He was top scorer in the Lithuanian A Lyga in the 2009 season. In January 2010, he signed a six-month contract with Greek Beta Ethniki side Panserraikos. Trakys left Panserraikos after they breached his contract.

Trakys then had a trial spell with Scottish Premier League club Hibernian, and signed on 14 September. He made his first starting appearance for Hibs in a 3–0 win against Rangers at Ibrox on 10 November 2010, but was informed by manager Colin Calderwood in April 2011 that his contract would not be renewed.

Career statistics

International goals

Scores and results list Lithuania's goal tally first.

Coaching career

From 2014 was head coach of FK Palanga. In 2017 season with FK Palanga won Lithuanian First League and team was promoted to 2018 A Lyga.

In January 2019 he became head coach of Minija.

In February 2019 became Lithuanian U-19 head coach.

References

External links

1979 births
Living people
Lithuanian footballers
Lithuania international footballers
FBK Kaunas footballers
FC Torpedo Moscow players
FC Torpedo-2 players
Fimleikafélag Hafnarfjarðar players
SpVgg Greuther Fürth players
VfL Osnabrück players
FK Atlantas players
FC Kuban Krasnodar players
FC Khimki players
Shamakhi FK players
FK Panerys Vilnius players
Panserraikos F.C. players
Hibernian F.C. players
A Lyga players
Azerbaijan Premier League players
Russian Premier League players
Scottish Premier League players
Football League (Greece) players
Lithuanian expatriate footballers
Expatriate footballers in Russia
Expatriate footballers in Iceland
Expatriate footballers in Germany
Expatriate footballers in Azerbaijan
Expatriate footballers in Scotland
Expatriate footballers in Greece
FC Oryol players
Lithuanian football managers
FK Palanga managers
Sportspeople from Kretinga
Association football forwards